Tropical Storm Don was the first tropical cyclone to make landfall in the United States during the 2011 season. The fourth named storm of the 2011 Atlantic hurricane season, Tropical Storm Don formed from an area of low pressure along a tropical wave, Don developed into a tropical depression on July 27, and on that same day, was upgraded to tropical storm intensity, based on data from a reconnaissance aircraft noted the presence of tropical-storm-force winds. It tracked across the Gulf of Mexico and reached a peak intensity of 50 mph (85 km/h) before moving ashore in Texas on July 30 as a tropical depression, dissipating shortly afterwards. Initially, Don was expected to provide relief to the state, which was suffering from a major drought. However, the system dissipated rapidly just before making landfall, providing very little in the way of help to the state; rainfall totals were less than 1 in (25 mm).

Meteorological history

The genesis of Tropical Storm Don was from a tropical wave first identified off the west coast of Africa on July 16. It tracked westward over the open Atlantic for several days, with minimal convection confined to the monsoon trough. The National Hurricane Center (NHC) first mentioned the potential for gradual tropical cyclogenesis on July 21, when it was positioned about 750 mi (1200 km) to the east of the Windward Islands. As the system moved through the Lesser Antilles on July 23, it produced tropical-storm-force winds in Puerto Rico. The combination of vertical wind shear and the wave's proximity to land impeded further development. Convection increased along the northern portion of the wave on July 24, although by the following day the NHC expected no significant redevelopment.

Early on July 26, the thunderstorms along the tropical wave became more concentrated to the south of Cuba, in association with a low-pressure area. The system continued to organize, and by 0600 UTC on July 27, the surface circulation became defined enough for it to be classified as a tropical depression about 60 mi (95 km) northeast of Cancún, Mexico. Within twelve hours, the depression intensified into a tropical storm. Operationally, the system was not known to be a tropical cyclone until 2100 UTC on July 27, after a reconnaissance aircraft flight into the system confirmed the presence of a closed, albeit elongated, circulation center. At that point, the NHC classified it as Tropical Storm Don. Upon forming, the storm moved to the west-northwest along the southern periphery of a low- to mid-level ridge over the northern Gulf of Mexico. Due to generally favorable conditions, including warm waters and light to moderate wind shear, the NHC predicted steady intensification to winds of at least 65 mph (100 km/h). However, none of the tropical cyclone forecast models anticipated much strengthening.

Initially, Don failed to intensify significantly due to a misalignment between the lower and mid-level circulations. The wind shear in the region further exposed the circulation from the convection late on July 28, although the winds increased slightly. Early on July 29, Don attained peak winds of 50 mph (85 km/h) as reported by the Hurricane Hunters, and the storm maintained that intensity while moving across the Gulf of Mexico. As Don approached the Texas coast early on July 30, the thunderstorms rapidly diminished due to the combination of wind shear, drier air, and cooler sea surface temperatures just offshore. The winds decreased as the convection dissipated, and Don made landfall on Padre Island National Seashore as a tropical depression at 0230 UTC on July 30. About three and a half hours later, Don degenerated into a remnant low, and the circulation dissipated six hours after that.

Preparations and impact

After Don was designated as a tropical storm, the Yucatán state government issued a green-level alert. The alert indicated that although the tropical storm was located close to the state, it was only considered to be slightly dangerous. Late on July 27, the National Hurricane Center issued a tropical storm watch from Port Mansfield to San Luis Pass in Texas. Six hours later, the tropical storm watch was extended southwards to the international border.

After the storm was named, officials in Texas began making preparations for Don. The University of Texas Medical Branch in Galveston issued a level one alert for Don, and city officials began preparing for a possible evacuation. On July 27, oil companies throughout the western Gulf of Mexico began removing non-essential personnel from their rigs and platforms in preparation for Don. The next day, BP, Royal Dutch Shell, Anadarko Petroleum and Apache Corporation announced the evacuations of some of the oil facilities in the area, while ExxonMobil began preparing the Baytown Refinery for a possible storm strike. Several oil companies stopped oil production as a result of Don; by midday on July 28, 6.8% of oil production and 2.8% of natural gas production in the Gulf had been shut in ahead of the storm.

However, Bay City, Texas, located well northeast of where the storm made landfall, reported . In southern Texas, the rains resulted in slippery roads and some ponding. Cotton farmers benefited from what rains that did fall as they harvested their crop. There were no reports of damage.

See also

Other storms with the same name 
List of Texas hurricanes (1980–present)
Tropical Storm Frances (1998) – affected a similar area
Tropical Storm Beta (2020) – affected a similar area.

References

External links

NHC advisory archive for Tropical Storm Don

Don
Don 2011
Don